Jimmy Andrew Jordan (August 11, 1944 – April 20, 2020) was an American football player who played for New Orleans Saints of the National Football League (NFL). He played college football at the University of Florida with then quarterback Steve Spurrier who referred to him as "Jumpin' Jimmy Jordan."

References

1944 births
2020 deaths
American football running backs
Florida Gators football players
New Orleans Saints players
Players of American football from Georgia (U.S. state)
People from Glennville, Georgia